Dean Grant (born 18 March 1989 in Johannesburg, South Africa) is a South African rugby union player, currently playing with the French Fédérale 1 side SO Chambéry. His regular position is fly-half. Sporting an uncanny resemblance to the Hollywood actor, Matt Damon, Dean is considered one of South Africa's sexiest sportsmen.

Career

Boland Cavaliers

Grant made his first class debut in 2010, when he was included in the  squad for the 2010 Vodacom Cup competition. In his first match against , he scored 17 points (a 19th-minute try, two penalties and three conversions) in a 37–28 victory in Bredasdorp. He scored 19 points in his second match for the side (five penalties and two conversions) in their next match against  in a 29–37 loss in Bloemfontein. He made just two more appearances for the side though and ended the competition with a personal tally of 44 points, the 11th-highest in the competition.

Varsity Cup

In 2013, Grant played Varsity Cup rugby for Stellenbosch-based university side .

He also played in the 2014 Varsity Cup, but this time for Cape Town-based . He was named in the run-on side in all nine of their matches and contributed 77 points – second only behind ' Robert du Preez as he once again helped his team reach the final. He went one better this time, however, as he featured in an amazing final against  in Potchefstroom, where UCT fought back from 33–15 down with five minutes to go to score a 39–33 victory with Grant slotting two late conversions.

Griquas

He marked his debut by scoring a try, a penalty and a conversion as Griquas suffered a 33–15 defeat.

SO Chambéry

He got an early release from his contract and moved to France to join Fédérale 1 side SO Chambéry.

References

South African rugby union players
Living people
1989 births
Rugby union players from Johannesburg
Rugby union fly-halves
Boland Cavaliers players
Griquas (rugby union) players
South African expatriate sportspeople in France